Arthur Salter may refer to:

Arthur Salter, 1st Baron Salter (1881–1975), British politician and academic, Member of Parliament 1937–1950 and 1951–1953
Arthur Salter (judge) (1859–1928), Member of Parliament for Basingstoke in 1906–1917, High Court Judge 1917–1928